Jaggedland is the tenth studio album by the rock artist Marshall Crenshaw. It was released in 2009 on 429 Records.

Track listing
All songs written by Marshall Crenshaw, except where noted.
"Right on Time" – 4:50
"Passing Through" (Crenshaw, Kelley Ryan) – 3:22
"Someone Told Me" – 4:29
"Stormy River" (Crenshaw, Richard Julian) – 5:02
"Gasoline Baby" – 1:49
"Never Coming Down" – 3:38
"Long Hard Road" – 3:09
"Jaggedland" – 2:41
"Sunday Blues" – 4:13
"Just Snap Your Fingers" (Crenshaw, Ryan) – 3:40
"Eventually" – 4:07
"Live and Learn" (Crenshaw, Matt Bair, Dan Bern) – 5:27

Personnel
Marshall Crenshaw - vocals, guitar, bass, drums, percussion, keyboards
Jim Keltner – drums, percussion
Sebastian Steinberg – bass
Greg Leisz – steel guitar, dobro, bass
Emil Richards – vibraphone, tambourine
Mike Viola – background vocals
Wayne Kramer – guitar
Diego Voglino – drums
Jason Crigler – slide guitar
Ben Rubin – bass
Rob Morseburger – keyboards
Deborah Assael – cello
Sarah Worden – viola, violin
Todd Chalfant - Photography

References 

2009 albums
Marshall Crenshaw albums
Albums produced by Stewart Lerman